The seventh edition of the Men's Asian Amateur Boxing Championships was held from September 23–28, 1975 in Yokohama, Japan.

Medal summary

Medal table

References

External links
Asian Boxing Confederation

Asian Amateur Boxing Championships
Asian Boxing
Boxing
1975 Asia